Robert Castelin (23 May 1920 – 11 July 2009) was a French racing cyclist. He rode in the 1950 Tour de France.

References

1920 births
2009 deaths
French male cyclists
Place of birth missing